Adine Rachel Wilson (née Harper, born 8 June 1979) is a former New Zealand international netball representative.

Personal background
Born in Hāwera, New Zealand, Wilson attended Turuturu School, Hawera Intermediate School and Hawera High School. She is married to Jeff Wilson, former New Zealand dual rugby and cricket player. The Wilsons have two sons and she is a lawyer by profession. Having studied law at the University of Otago, she was admitted to the bar in 2003.

Domestic career
Wilson joined the Otago Rebels, while studying law and physical education at the University of Otago. She signed with the Southern Sting for the 2001 season and remained with the franchise until 2007, winning five titles. In 2008, Wilson pulled out of the new Southern Steel team in the inaugural ANZ Championship because of pregnancy.

Wilson returned to the game in 2009 and captained the Southern Steel. She retired after the 2009 season, confirming she was once again pregnant.

International career
She debuted for the Silver Ferns in 1999 at 20 years of age and became the team's captain in March 2005. She started her playing career as a shooter, later moving to the mid-court to concentrate on the wing attack position.

She captained the Silver Ferns from 2005 to 2007, highlighted by captaining the gold medal winning Silver Ferns side that beat Australia at the 2006 Commonwealth Games.

References

1979 births
Living people
New Zealand netball players
New Zealand international netball players
Commonwealth Games gold medallists for New Zealand
Commonwealth Games medallists in netball
Netball players at the 2006 Commonwealth Games
1999 World Netball Championships players
2003 World Netball Championships players
2007 World Netball Championships players
Southern Steel players
ANZ Championship players
People educated at Hawera High School
Sportspeople from Hāwera
Southern Sting players
Otago Rebels players
Medallists at the 2006 Commonwealth Games